Mount Klayn is the peak rising to 2086 m in the northern portion of Bastien Range in Ellsworth Mountains, Antarctica. The feature extends 2.8 km, trending north-northeast, and is 900 m wide.  It has steep and partly ice-free southeast slopes, and surmounts upper Nimitz Glacier to the northeast.

The peak is named after Laslo Klayn, geologist at St. Kliment Ohridski base in 1999/2000 and subsequent seasons.

Location
US mapping in 1961 and 1988.

Maps
 Vinson Massif.  Scale 1:250 000 topographic map.  Reston, Virginia: US Geological Survey, 1988.
 Antarctic Digital Database (ADD). Scale 1:250000 topographic map of Antarctica. Scientific Committee on Antarctic Research (SCAR). Since 1993, regularly updated.

Notes

References
 Mount Klayn. SCAR Composite Gazetteer of Antarctica.
 Bulgarian Antarctic Gazetteer. Antarctic Place-names Commission. (details in Bulgarian, basic data in English)

External links
 Mount Klayn. Copernix satellite image

Ellsworth Mountains
Bulgaria and the Antarctic
Mountains of Ellsworth Land